Kurt Geiger is a luxury British footwear and accessories brand. Kurt Geiger has around 70 stores, and approximately 170 concessions within department stores, including Harrods and Selfridges. Kurt Geiger owns three brands Kurt Geiger London, KG Kurt Geiger and Carvela Kurt Geiger, created by its in-house team.

The Kurt Geiger headquarters is located off Britton Street, Clerkenwell, London. The building, originally dating from the 1970s, was remodelled in 2009 by Archer Architects and is finished in a distinctive red, described as Pompean Red.

History
The company is named after its Austrian founder.

After a management buyout in 2008, it was sold by Graphite Capital to the U.S.-based brand management company The Jones Group in 2011. In 2014, the Jones Group was acquired by Sycamore Partners, who spun off Kurt Geiger into its own company.

In December 2015, London-based private equity firm Cinven acquired Kurt Geiger from its previous owner, New York-based private equity firm Sycamore Partners, for £245 million.

References

Shoe companies of the United Kingdom
Companies based in London
Footwear retailers
Retail companies established in 1963
2015 mergers and acquisitions